Charlotte Seymour may refer to:

 Charlotte Spencer, Countess Spencer (1835–1903), née Seymour, British philanthropist
 Charlotte Seymour, Duchess of Somerset (1693–1773),
 Charlotte Seymour (producer), Australian film producer, of upcoming television series  Bruny